Chile national under-20 football team, also known as Chile Sub-20 or La Rojita, is part of the Federación de Fútbol de Chile. The U-20 team is considered to be the breeding ground for future Chile national football team players. The Chile U-20 national team has participated in six U-20 World Cups Chile 1987, Qatar 1995, Argentina 2001, Netherlands 2005, Canada 2007 and Turkey 2013.

One of the best and earliest U-20 World Cup campaigns was when Chile hosted the tournament in 1987, finishing in fourth place. In the most recent 2007 U-20 World Cup the team earned a third-place position, making it Chile's most successful U-20 campaign to date.

The Chile national U-20 football team also participates in the South American Youth Championship which act as qualifier for the U-20 World Cup.

Chile National U-20 Football Team: World Cups

U-20 World Cup: Chile 1987
The first World Cup the U-20 national team gained entry came in 1987 when Chile was granted the right to host. Chile headed Group A which included Australia, Togo, and Yugoslavia. October 10, 1987 Chile faced eventual tournament winners Yugoslavia in Santiago in the presence of a crowd totaling 67,000 spectators. All of Chile's early group matches were held in Santiago at the Estadio Nacional. Chile lost the opening game by a score of 2–4, with Lukas Tudor and Camilo Pino scoring for the squad.

The second match against Togo, had Chile winning by a score of 3–0, with Pino scoring through a penalty kick in the '8 minute of the match. Tudor would also respond by scoring two goals in the 32nd and 75th minute of the match and securing victory.

The next game against Australia was staged in front of 75,000 people. Chile using the advantage of having support from its crowd, defeated Australia 2–0 with both goals coming from Pino in the 22nd and 52nd minutes of the match.

Chile advanced to the Quarter-Finals in second place, and later played Italy in the city of Concepción, Chile. Chile's margin of victory came with the minimum difference of a 1–0 score. The result in effect would lead ti a face-off against West Germany in the Semi-Finals. The match featured West Germany ultimately winning 4–0. The third place spot was to be played against East Germany where Chile fell on penalty kicks 3–1 after a game that had both sides drawn 1–1.

U-20 World Cup: Netherlands 2005
June 11, 2005, Chile faced CONCACAF opponents Honduras at the De Vijverberg stadium in Doetinchem, Netherlands, in what was to be the first match pertaining to group C. Massimo Busacca from Switzerland was the referee of the match. Chile, in front of 6,800 spectators, opened the scoring in the first-half with goals from forward Parada in the 11th minute and midfielder José Pedro Fuenzalida in the 30th minute. The scoring momentum continued onto the second-half, where Fuenzalida added another goal onto his personal tally in the 53rd minute, while Matías Fernández followed with a goal of his own in the 67th. Two minutes later, in the 69th, Gonzalo Jara would also score which was followed by another strike from Parada in the 71st. Pedro Morales concluded with the last goal of the day in the 77th minute, making the final score 7–0, an impressive start for "La Rojita''.

Four days later, on June 15, 2005, Chile experienced a crushing blow against Spain. The match was again held at De Vijverberg, and the referee in charge was Benito Archundia from Mexico. An estimate of 6,600 spectators were in attendance with Spaniard Fernando Llorente scoring four goals. Chile, playing with ten men witnessed, fell 0–7, bringing their goal differential to zero.

On June 17, 2005, at Galgenwaard Stadion in Utrecht (city), Chile competed against Morocco amid a crowd of 11,000. The referee was Australian Mark Shield. The only goal was scored by Moroccan forward Tarik Bendamou in the 47th minute.

A total of three points was enough for Chile to qualify in a best third place spot for the second round and on June 22, 2005, Chile played hosts Netherlands at De Vijverberg stadium. Dutch forwards Ryan Babel, Quincy Owusu-Abeyie and Collins John would each score for the Dutch in a game finishing 3–0, thus eliminating Chile from the World Cup.

U-20 World Cup: Canada 2007
Canada 2007 was Chile's fifth overall participation in the U-20 world youth championship. Chile opened Group A against the host nation of Canada in Toronto, with Chile winning 3–0. The game featured a Chilean side with adequate possession of the ball and attentive striking from forwards Medina, team captain Carlos Carmona, and late game substitute Jaime Grondona.

The second match was against the African youth champions the Republic of Congo in Edmonton. Chile soundly defeated a ten-man squad with a score of 3–0, goals coming from striker Alexis Sánchez, Nicolás Medina and Arturo Vidal.

The third game was against Austria where after 90 minutes the game ended in scoreless 0–0, the result was enough for Chile to clinch the first spot of the group. In the second round, Chile went up against Portugal, who had qualified as third of their group. Chile with a goal from Vidal in the 45th minute of first half secured a pass onto the quarter-final.

The quarter-final included Nigeria, where after a scoreless 90 minutes the game was to be decided in extra time.  Within the next final 30 minutes of the match, Chile would win 4–0 with finishes coming off a header from Jaime Grondona, a penalty kick by Mauricio Isla after Chilean player Mathías Vidangossy was brought down in the box, a deadly counter strike finish from Isla in the 117th minute and a late finish from Vidangossy after rounding the goalkeeper in injury time.

The semi-final against Argentina proved controversial where referee Wolfgang Stark would send off two Chilean players, Dagoberto Currimilla and Gary Medel. Playing with nine men proved drastic, as Chile would go on to lose 3–0.

The third place spot brought a familiar opponent group A, rivals Austria. The match was a consolation prize for the teams in dispute and a meritable reward after a hard-fought campaign. Both countries would initiate great plays. One goal was enough with Chile's defender Hans Martínez hitting the ball past the goalkeeper and onto the net from a free kick cross, ending the match 1–0.

Goalkeeper Christopher Toselli set a record after going 492 minutes without conceding a goal, breaking the old record of 484 minutes held by under-20 Brazilian goalkeeper Cláudio Taffarel since the 1985 World Cup.

Alexis Sánchez, Mathías Vidangossy, Arturo Vidal, Cristián Suárez and Christopher Toselli all listed as candidates for top player of the tournament.

U-20 World Cup: Turkey 2013

Turkey 2013 marks the sixth time the Chilean U-20 team has participated in the U-20 world youth championship. The Chilean team ended the first stage of the championship in second position with 4 points, with a victory against Egypt (2-1), a draw against England (1-1), and a final defeat against Iraq (1-2). Despite the mixed results, the team advanced to the knockout stages, defeating Croatia (2-1).

Competitive record

FIFA World Youth Championship Record

Honours

 FIFA U-20 World Cup
 Third place (1): 2007
 Fourth place (1): 1987

List of FIFA U-20 World Cup matches

By match

Record by opponent

Players

Current squad 

The following 23 players were called up for the 2023 South American U-20 Championship.

Former squads

1987 FIFA World Youth Championship

Coach: Luis Ibarra

1995 FIFA World Youth Championship
 

Coach: Leonardo Véliz

2001 FIFA World Youth Championship

Coach: Hector Pinto

2005 FIFA World Youth Championship

Coach: José Sulantay

2007 FIFA U-20 World Cup

Coach: José Sulantay

2013 FIFA U-20 World Cup

Coach: Mario Salas

See also
 South American Youth Championship
 Chile national under-17 football team
 Chile (Senior) team

References

External links
 Official ANFP Asociacion Nacional de Futbol Professional
 FIFA.com: FIFA U-20 World Cup 2007
Chilean football forum on national teams

Under
South American national under-20 association football teams
Youth sport in Chile